Saint-Léons  (Languedocien: Sant Liònç) is a commune in the Aveyron department in southern France.

It was the birthplace of the entomologist Jean-Henri Fabre (1823–1915).

Population

See also
Communes of the Aveyron department

References

Communes of Aveyron
Aveyron communes articles needing translation from French Wikipedia